Tanya Heaslip is an author based in Alice Springs in Australia's Northern Territory. In 2019 Heaslip released her memoir: Alice to Prague : the charming true story of an outback girl who finds adventure - and love - on the other side of the world.

Biography 

Tanya Heaslip was born to Grant and Janice Heaslip and grew up on Bond Springs Station in Central Australia in the 1960s. For her early schooling Heaslip attended school through the School of the Air before going to boarding school interstate. Following school she went on to read law at the University of Adelaide and entered legal practice.

A long term fascination with Europe led to Heaslip leaving Australia to teach in the Czech Republic in 1994; with little more than a battered copy of Let's Go Europe in her backpack. Heaslip lived in the post-communist Czech Republic for two and a half years where she taught English at a high school in a town she had never heard of and with no teaching experience.

Following her return to Australia Heaslip starting writing about her experiences, first of her time in the Czech Republic and subsequently of growing up in Central Australia and attending boarding school in Adelaide. 

She now lives in Alice Springs with her husband. Two further memoirs about Heaslip's childhood, An Alice Girl and Beyond Alice were released in May 2020 and May 2021 respectively.

Interview 
Heaslip was interviewed by Emma Haskin about her upbringing at Bond Springs Station on ABC Alice Springs on Saturday Mornings with Rohan Barwick on 21 March 2020; the full interview is available here.

References 

People from Alice Springs
Australian writers
Australian women writers
Living people
Year of birth missing (living people)